Craig Teevan is an Australian former professional rugby league footballer who played in the 1980s and 1990s. During his time as a player, he represented five clubs in his usual positions of hooker or halfback and also played State of Origin for Queensland.

Early life
While attending	Oakey State High in 1986, Teevan was selected for the Australian schoolboys rugby league team.

Playing career
Teevan was appointed captain of the South Queensland Crushers for the 1995 ARL season.  Teevan played in the club's final ever game which was 39-18 victory against Western Suburbs.  The following season, Teevan joined the Gold Coast and played in their final ever game as a first grade side which was a 20-18 loss against Cronulla-Sutherland.

At representative level, Teevan was selected for the Queensland team's interchange bench in all three games of the Maroons' successful 1995 State of Origin series.

Post playing
Teevan was the CEO of Ipswich Jets rugby league club.

References

External links 

Queensland representatives data at qrl.com.au

1970 births
Australian rugby league players
Brisbane Broncos players
Cronulla-Sutherland Sharks players
Queensland Rugby League State of Origin players
Manly Warringah Sea Eagles players
South Queensland Crushers players
Gold Coast Chargers players
Living people
Rugby league hookers
Rugby league halfbacks